Irán Castillo Pinzón (born 4 January 1977) is a Mexican actress and singer.

Castillo began her career in the 1990s, after roles in telenovelas such as Agujetas de color de rosa, Confidente de Secundaria, and Preciosa. Subsequently, she appeared in telenovelas such as Soñadoras, Amar Otra Vez and Clase 406, as well as films like El Tigre de Santa Julia, La Segunda Noche and Cabeza de Buda.  Also she is known as a singer for her single "Yo por el" (1997).

Biography

Castillo started her career at the age of 7 years doing commercials. She took acting classes with Martha Zabaleta and Pedro Damián at the age of 12, and then appeared in the soap opera Ángeles Blancos in 1989.

She has acted in 15 telenovelas (soap operas) in her career, including Agujetas de color de rosa made in 1994, Retrato de familia in 1996, Confidente de secundaria in 1996, Preciosa in 1998 and Soñadoras made in 1998; she also participated in El Club de Gaby and the series Qué chavas.

She began her career as a singer in the musical group Mosquitas Muertas in 1991. She later recorded songs featured in soap operas she starred in until she finally released her first album Tiempos Nuevos and the single "Yo Por El" in 1997 featuring rhythmical ballads.

Tatuada en tus besos is the title of the second and last album that she released in 1999. In the same year, she had success with her performance in the musical comedy Gypsy  opposite Silvia Pinal.

Previously, she had acted in other plays such as Celos-Dije and Vaselina (Grease) taking the main role of Sandy. She also starred in Mexican films such as Que Vivan los Muertos and La Segunda Noche.

Castillo acted in a television soap opera titled Locura de Amor, playing Natalia, and managed to captivate the public, in spite of her short appearance on-screen.  In 2001 Castillo made a special role in the telenovela Aventuras en el Tiempo.

In 2002 Castillo appeared in the soap opera Clase 406 and the film El Tigre de Santa Julia. In 2003 Castillo starred in Amar otra vez, in which she played the protagonist. This melodrama was released in January 2004 in the United States]and in May of the same year in Mexico. During the previous year, Castillo formed part of Alborada, a soap opera by Carla Estrada, as Catalina Escobar, sister of the protagonist role played by Lucero.

In 2006 Castillo was featured in two Mexican films: Amor Xtremo with a protagonist role, and Efectos Secundarios as Gabriela. In summer 2006, Castillo was invited to form part of the Mexican reality show Bailando por la Boda de Mis Sueños, with her partner Romeo. In September 2006, Castillo made a photoshoot for Max Magazine. Later in May, 2007 she made another photoshoot for H magazine, and also in July, Castillo appeared nude in H Extremo, which is the uncensored version of H.

During 2007, Castillo appeared in movies like Victorio, Viernes de Animas (released in 2011), and also on the TV series El Panteraand Mujeres Asesinas. In 2008, she appeared in Sabel, an animation movie, and Cabeza de Buda with Kuno Becker.

In 2009, Castillo returned to theaters in 12 mujeres en Pugna and Los 39 escalones.  In 2010 she also appeared in the play El Mago de oz 2010 and the movies 31 Días and Morgana.

Recently, she starred in the TV series "Los Secretos de Lucía", that was filmed in Caracas, Venezuela.   Also won the third place at the reality show "Bailando por un sueño".  Nowadays she's releasing her brand new album "Amanecer", which marks her comeback in the music business after 14 years of her last record "Tatuada en tus besos". The first single "Sabes Que" was well received in the social media.

Discography

Albums
 Tiempos Nuevos (1997)
 Tatuada en tus besos (1999)
 "Amanecer" (2014)

Singles

Tiempos Nuevos (1997)
Yo Por El
Locos De Amor
La Flor Del Paraíso

Tatuada en tus besos (1999)
Por Ti, Por Mi
Sola
No Vendrá
Di Que No
Y Pienso En Ti

Amanecer (2014)
 Sabes Que
 Libertad

TBA (2019)
De Repente

Others
 Amandote from Confidente de Secundaria (1995)
 Confidente De Secundaria from Confidente De Secundaria (1995)
 Feliz Navidad from Estrellas de Navidad (1997)
 Girando En El Tiempo from Preciosa (1998)

Filmography

Films

Television

References

External links

Iran Castillo's Official website

1977 births
Living people
Mexican child actresses
Mexican telenovela actresses
Mexican television actresses
Mexican film actresses
Mexican stage actresses
Actresses from Veracruz
Singers from Veracruz
20th-century Mexican actresses
21st-century Mexican actresses
People from Veracruz (city)
21st-century Mexican singers
21st-century Mexican women singers